Capp is a surname. Notable people with the surname include:

Al Capp (1909–1979), American cartoonist and humorist
David A. Capp (born 1950), American attorney
Dick Capp (born 1942), American football player
Frank Capp (1931–2017), American jazz drummer
Sally Capp, Australian politician
Terry Capp, Canadian drag racer
Thomas Capp (died 1635), English painter and gilder